The 1961–62 Sussex County Football League season was the 37th in the history of the competition.

Division 1 increased seventeen teams with Hastings Rangers being promoted from Division 2, Haywards Heath also joined Division 1 from leaving the Metropolitan League. Division 2 was remained at sixteen teams again, from which the winner would be promoted into Division 1. LEC Sports left Division 2 and were replaced by Selsey.

Division One
The division featured 17 clubs, 15 which competed in the last season, along with two new clubs:
Hastings Rangers, promoted from last season's Division Two
Haywards Heath, joined from Metropolitan League

League table

Division Two
The division featured 16 clubs, 14 which competed in the last season, along with two new clubs:
Shoreham, relegated from last season's Division One
Selsey

League table

References

1961-62
9